Viburnum costaricanum is a species of plant in the Adoxaceae family. It is found in Costa Rica and Panama. It is threatened by habitat loss.

References

costaricanum
Near threatened plants
Taxonomy articles created by Polbot